Mahatma Gandhi Memorial Centre, Matale is a memorial situated in Matale in Central Province, Sri Lanka.

It was inaugurated by President Maithripala Sirisena and Indian High Commissioner Y. K. Sinha on 22 November 2015. The Mahatma Gandhi Memorial was built in remembrance of Mahatma Gandhi's historical visit to Sri Lanka (then called Ceylon) in 1927.

See also 
 Mahatma Gandhi's visit to Ceylon

References

2015 establishments in Sri Lanka
Buildings and structures in Matale
Matale